Leroy Rivett (born 17 December 1976) is an English former professional rugby league and rugby union footballer who played in the 1990s and 2000s.

Background
Leroy Rivett was born in Leicester, England.

Playing career
Leroy Rivett's amateur career began for the Leeds side Pendas Panthers (now known as Whinmoor Warriors) for the under-eleven age-group, but he soon moved to play for East Leeds, where he joined numerous other future professionals in a very strong junior team. As this team grew older, it won numerous trophies, most notably the British Amateur Rugby League Association National Youth League and National Youth Cup double in 1995. In September 1995, he joined Leeds Rhinos.

Rivett rose to prominence towards the end of the season, helping Leeds reach the 1998 Super League Grand Final by scoring two tries in the final eliminator of the Super League play-offs against St. Helens. He played on the wing for the final in the 10–4 defeat by Wigan Warriors.

Rivett is perhaps best known for his performance for Leeds Rhinos in the Rugby League Challenge Cup Final at Wembley Stadium in 1999 when he grabbed four tries against London Broncos and walked away with the Lance Todd Trophy as man of the match.

Leroy Rivett made his début for Warrington Wolves on Friday 19 April 2002, and he played his last match for Warrington Wolves on Saturday 22 June 2002.

References

External links
(archived by web.archive.org) Profile at Leeds Rhinos website

1976 births
Living people
Bramley RLFC players
Chorley Lynx players
Doncaster R.L.F.C. players
English rugby league players
Huddersfield Giants players
Hull Kingston Rovers players
Keighley Cougars players
Lance Todd Trophy winners
Leeds Rhinos players
Leigh Leopards players
Otley R.U.F.C. players
Rochdale Hornets players
Rugby league players from Leicestershire
Rugby league wingers
Rugby union wings
Sale Sharks players
Rugby union players from Leicester
Villefranche XIII Aveyron players
Warrington Wolves players